Arrufiac (or Arrufiat) is a white French wine grape variety that is primarily planted in the Gascony region of South West France. It is a secondary grape in the wines from the Pacherenc du Vic-Bilh Appellation d'origine contrôlée (AOC). While the grape has had a long history being blended with Petit Courbu in Gascon wines, it has only recently experienced a resurgence of interest in the late 20th century following the release of white blends from Andrė Dubosc of Producteurs Plaimont, one of the region's largest co-operative wineries, in the 1980s.

Wine regions

Arrufiac has had a long history of use in the wines of Gascony, particularly those from the AOC region of Pacherenc du Vic-Bilh, covering the same area as Madiran, and those from the Béarn AOC in the Vic-Bilh hills.
There, the grape was often blended with Petit Courbu which, along with Arrufiac's distinctive gunflint aroma, gave the wines of Pacherenc du Vic-Bilh a distinctive contrast to the white wines of nearby Jurançon. Additionally, winemakers in Gascony have blended Arrufiac with the other grapes of Jurançon, Petit Manseng and Gros Manseng.

Wine styles
Arrufiac is used primarily as a blending wine with its medium body and relatively low alcohol levels for a wine grown in southern France. In blends, its main contribution is in the aroma and bouquet, with wines featuring Arrufiac often marked by a distinctive gunflint note.

Synonyms
Arrufiac and its wines are known under a variety of synonyms including Ambre, Arafiat, Arrefiac, Arrefiat, Arrufiat, Arufiat, Raffiac, Raffiat, Refiat, Rouffiac Femelle, Ruffiac, Ruffiac Blanc, and Rufiat.

References

White wine grape varieties